WMBC-LP (100.9 FM) was a radio station licensed to Norton Shores, Michigan, United States. The station was owned by Maranatha Bible And Missionary Conference.

On the June 1, 2012, the station's license was cancelled and its call sign deleted by the Federal Communications Commission from its database, per the licensee's request.

References

External links
 

Defunct religious radio stations in the United States
MBC-LP
MBC-LP
Radio stations established in 2004
Radio stations disestablished in 2012
Defunct radio stations in the United States
2004 establishments in Michigan
2012 disestablishments in Michigan
MBC-LP